Aegicetus is an extinct genus of protocetid whale based on a partial skull with much of an associated postcranial skeleton discovered in Egypt. It lived around 35 million years ago (during the Late Eocene), making it the youngest known protocetid to date. Aegicetus was discovered in 2007 at Wadi El Hitan (Gehannam Formation) as a relatively complete skeleton and a partial second specimen. They were assigned to a new genus and species in 2019 by Philip D. Gingerich et al.

Aegicetus is reported to have been intermediate in form and functionally transitional in having a larger and more powerful vertebral column of a tail-powered swimmer. It differs from Peregocetus by lacking a firm sacroiliac joint and from Rodhocetus by having smaller hind feet, indicating it were less capable of moving on land and relied less on its hind limbs to propel through the water.

References 

Protocetidae
Fossils_of_Egypt
Taxa named by Philip D. Gingerich
Fossil taxa described in 2019
Prehistoric cetacean genera